The Eclectic Vince Guaraldi is the 11th and penultimate studio album by American jazz pianist Vince Guaraldi, released in the U.S. by Warner Bros.-Seven Arts in March 1969. In a departure from his standard jazz output, Guaraldi experimented with electric keyboard and electric harpsichord in preparation of the release of the album, which he also produced and arranged.

Background
Vince Guaraldi's final three albums released during his lifetime were recorded for Warner Bros.-Seven Arts after spending considerable time struggling to extricate himself from Fantasy Records. Warner signed Guaraldi to a three-record deal, and insisted that his inaugural release consist of his Peanuts songs. Guaraldi responded with new renditions of eight of his most popular scores from those programs on his first release, Oh Good Grief!.

Guaraldi was then given complete artistic control over his sophomore, self-produced Warner effort, The Eclectic Vince Guaraldi, resulting in an unfocused and overindulgent album that was not well received by both critics and consumers. Only one track, "Lucifer's Lady", would eventually be featured in the film A Boy Named Charlie Brown (1969) and the television special, Play It Again, Charlie Brown (1971). The album includes a cover of The Beatles’ song "Yesterday".

A remastered edition of The Eclectic Vince Guaraldi was released in July 6, 2018, by Omnivore Recordings as part of the 2-CD set The Complete Warner Bros.–Seven Arts Recordings.

Critical reception

The Eclectic Vince Guaraldi received mixed reviews from critics. In a retrospective review by Richard S. Ginell on AllMusic, he commented that Guaraldi "roams farther afield than ever — playing piano and electric harpsichord, experimenting with sleek string backdrops, dabbling with the guitar." Ginell also called Guaraldi's "amateur Bohemian vocal" attempts at singing Tim Hardin's "Black Sheep Boy" and "Reason to Believe" "rather endearing." Ginell concluded by saying Guaraldi "generally keeps things at a low-key level, which gives this scattershot album at least a veneer of unity."

Guaraldi historian Derrick Bang offered a mediocre review, saying "everybody's allowed to be grotesquely self-indulgent once, but this overproduced album...is well-named even by the most magnanimous standards," added that Guaraldi's vocals are "untrained at best, off-key at worst, and ill-advised in both cases." Bang points out that Guaraldi's "traditional acoustic jazz persona" is only represented by "Once I Loved" and Ervin Drake's "It Was a Very Good Year."

Track listing

Personnel
Vince Guaraldi – piano, electric harpsichord, guitar, lead vocals ("Black Sheep Boy", "Reason to Believe")
Eddie Duran, Robert Addison – guitars
Bob Maize, Jim McCabe – electric bass
Peter Marshall – bass
Jerry Granelli, Al Coster – drums
Gloria Strassner, Jesse Ehrlich – cello

References

External links
 

1969 albums
Vince Guaraldi albums
Warner Records albums
Peanuts music